Luis Felipe Vivénes Urbanesa (born October 6, 1980 in Cumaná, Sucre) is an amateur Venezuelan freestyle wrestler, who played for the men's heavyweight category. He won two medals each for his division at the Pan American Games (2007 in Rio de Janeiro, Brazil, and 2011 in Guadalajara, Mexico), and at the Central American and Caribbean Games (2006 in Cartagena, Colombia, and 2010 in Mayagüez, Puerto Rico).

Vivenes represented Venezuela at the 2008 Summer Olympics in Beijing, where he competed as a lone male wrestler in the men's 96 kg class. He received a bye for the second preliminary round, before losing out to Kazakhstan's Taimuraz Tigiyev, who was able to score nine points in two straight periods, leaving Vivenes without a single point. Because his opponent advanced further into the final match, Vivenes offered another shot for the bronze medal by entering the repechage bouts. Unfortunately, he was defeated by Cuba's Michel Batista in the first round, with a technical score of 1–3.

References

External links
Profile – International Wrestling Database
NBC 2008 Olympics profile

1980 births
Living people
Olympic wrestlers of Venezuela
Wrestlers at the 2007 Pan American Games
Wrestlers at the 2011 Pan American Games
Wrestlers at the 2008 Summer Olympics
People from Cumaná
Pan American Games silver medalists for Venezuela
Venezuelan male sport wrestlers
Pan American Games medalists in wrestling
Wrestlers at the 2015 Pan American Games
Central American and Caribbean Games gold medalists for Venezuela
Central American and Caribbean Games bronze medalists for Venezuela
Competitors at the 2006 Central American and Caribbean Games
Competitors at the 2010 Central American and Caribbean Games
South American Games gold medalists for Venezuela
South American Games medalists in wrestling
Competitors at the 2014 South American Games
Wrestlers at the 2019 Pan American Games
Central American and Caribbean Games medalists in wrestling
Medalists at the 2007 Pan American Games
Medalists at the 2011 Pan American Games
Medalists at the 2019 Pan American Games
20th-century Venezuelan people
21st-century Venezuelan people